Eugene Salamin may refer to:

Eugene Salamin (mathematician), American mathematician 
Eugene Salamin (artist) (1912–2009), American painter